Move to This is the debut album by British dance artist Cathy Dennis.  It was released in 1990, and later re-issued and re-released as slightly different versions around the world.

Singles

Move to This spawned five singles which were spread out over a period of two years.  The first single, "C'mon and Get My Love", which also appeared on the D Mob album A Little Bit of This, a Little Bit of That and was credited to either D Mob or "D Mob introducing Cathy Dennis", was released in 1989.  It charted in the UK, where it peaked at number 15 on the UK Singles Chart, Australia, where it peaked at number 35, and the US, where it hit number one on the Hot Dance Club Play chart, and also number 10 on the Billboard Hot 100.

"Just Another Dream" was the next single to be released from the album, in 1989.  The initial release managed just number 93 on the UK Singles Chart.  It was re-released twice, first in 1990, and again in 1991.  The first reissue only made it to number 95 on the UK chart, but managed number 9 on the US Hot 100. The second reissue performed much better, hitting number 13 in the UK, number 2 on the US Hot Dance chart, and Dennis' best chart performance to date in Australia, at number 14.

The next single, after the first release of "Just Another Dream", was "All Night Long (Touch Me)" - a lyrical reworking of a 1984 track by Wish featuring Fonda Rae - which was released in 1991, and remains Dennis' highest-charting single to date. On music charts this song was listed as "Touch Me (All Night Long)". It was her third and final single to hit number one on the Hot Dance Club Play chart in the US, where it also peaked at number 2 on the Hot 100. In the UK, it reached number 5 on the Singles Chart, and in Australia it topped out at number 16.

"Too Many Walls" was the next single from the album, which was released in 1991. It peaked at number 1 on the US Hot Adult Contemporary Tracks chart, where it also managed number 8 on the Hot 100. In the UK, the song made number 17 on the Singles Chart, and in Australia, it managed number 57.

"Everybody Move" was the final single from Move to This, which was released in 1991. It hit number 25 on the UK Singles Chart, and number 41 on the US Dance chart. It barely sneaked onto the US Hot 100, at number 90.

Track listing

2014 Remastered Expanded Edition

Personnel 
 Cathy Dennis – lead and harmony vocals, backing vocals (5)
 Garry Hughes – programming (1, 2, 3, 6, 7, 9, 10)
 Marius de Vries – programming (1, 3, 4, 5, 9, 10)
 Alan Schwartz – additional programming (1)
 Eric Cody – keyboards, keyboard programming (8)
 Paul Taylor – programming (4)
 Paul Ellis – programming (5)
 Richard Hilton – keyboards (6, 8), drum programming (6), keyboard programming (8)
 Tony Plater – guitars (2)
 Nile Rodgers – guitars (5, 8)
 Bernard Edwards – bass (5)
 Ivan Hampden Jr. – drums (5)
 Anne Dudley – string arrangements (3, 4)
 Mike Stevens – brass (4)
 Dancin' Danny D. – backing vocals (1)
 Juliet Roberts – backing vocals (2)
 D Mob – backing vocals (3)
 Curtis King – backing vocals (5)
 Fonzi Thornton – backing vocals (5)
 Michelle Cobbs – backing vocals (6)
 Lamya – backing vocals (6)

Production 
 Bruce Carbone – executive producer
 Dancin' Danny D. – producer (1, 3)
 Shep Pettibone – co-producer (1), mixing (1, 2)
 Phil Bodger – producer (2, 4, 5, 7, 9, 10), engineer, mixing (8)
 Cathy Dennis – producer (2, 4, 5, 7, 9, 10), mixing (8)
 Nile Rodgers – producer (6, 8)
 Alan Gregorie – remix engineer (1)
 Dave Burnham – assistant engineer (4)
 Tom Duarte – mixing (6)
 Budd Tunick – production manager
 Michael Nash Associates – album design 
 Zanna – photography 
 Simon Fuller – management (UK)
 Arma Andon – management (USA)

Charts
Move to This entered the US Billboard 200 on the week of 15 December 1990 at number 173. It spent 40 weeks on the chart, where it peaked at number 67 on the week of 11 May 1991. It was certified Gold in Canada and the United Kingdom.

Weekly charts

Year-end charts

Certifications

References

1990 debut albums
Cathy Dennis albums
Albums produced by Nile Rodgers
Polydor Records albums